The Committee for Culture, Arts and Leisure was established to advise and assist the Minister for Culture, Arts and Leisure, on matters within his responsibility as a minister. The committee undertook a scrutiny, policy development and consultation role with respect to the Department of Culture, Arts and Leisure and played a key role in the consideration and development of legislation.

The committee was abolished in 2016 because the Department of Culture, Arts and Leisure was closed and its mandate was transferred to other departments.

Membership 
Membership before DCAL's closure:

See also 
 Department of Culture, Arts and Leisure

References

External links 
 Committee of Culture, Arts and Leisure

Northern Ireland Assembly